Ceratopetalum succirubrum is a species of plant in the family Cunoniaceae. It is found in Australia, West Papua (Indonesia), and Papua New Guinea. It is threatened by habitat loss. First collected by botanists at Gadgarra on the Atherton Tableland.

Ceratopetalum succirubrum is also known as satin sycamore, blood-in-the-bark and North Queensland coachwood.

References

succirubrum
Oxalidales of Australia
Flora of Queensland
Flora of Papua New Guinea
Flora of Western New Guinea
Vulnerable flora of Australia
Vulnerable biota of Queensland
Taxonomy articles created by Polbot